Lichenopeltella coppinsii is a species of lichenicolous fungus belonging to the class Dothideomycetes. It was described in 1999. It is known to infect Verrucaria muralis and has been reported from the British Isles, Ukraine, and Moshchny Island in the Baltic sea.

References

Dothideomycetes
Fungi described in 1999
Fungi of Europe
Fungi of Russia
Fungi of the United Kingdom
Lichenicolous fungi